Vilho Lennart "Lenni" Viitala (8 November 1921 – 24 February 1966) was a Finnish flyweight wrestler who won gold medals in freestyle wrestling at the 1946 European Athletics Championships and 1948 Olympics. Domestically Viitala won five freestyle (1946–49, 1956) and one Greco-Roman title (1953). He was a carpenter by profession.

References

1921 births
1966 deaths
Olympic wrestlers of Finland
Wrestlers at the 1948 Summer Olympics
Finnish male sport wrestlers
Olympic gold medalists for Finland
Olympic medalists in wrestling
Medalists at the 1948 Summer Olympics
European Wrestling Championships medalists
People from Kankaanpää
Sportspeople from Satakunta
20th-century Finnish people